Previously the Human Resources & Career Centre for Students and the Hire-a-Student program, the Service Canada Centres for Youth (SCCY) were centres, set up by the Government of Canada as part of its Youth Employment Strategy, by which it helped students and employers across Canada with their summer employment needs. Due to declining attendance, the Federal Government permanently closed these centres in 2012.

In 1968, the first Hire-A-Student office was erected as a pilot project within a Canada Employment Centre (CECs) in Moose Jaw, Saskatchewan.  The Federal Government supported the idea and in 1971, provided funds to establish Hire-A-Student offices in separate premises. The chief function, under supervision from the parent CEC, was to serve as a referral and placement service for students and employers. The philosophy behind the SCCY offices was peer group service: students helping students to find jobs. In 2008, the SCCYs celebrated the 40th anniversary of the program.

Summer jobs help students develop their skills, and offer them the work experience they need to build their career. SCCY provided a variety of free services to assist students improve their job search skills, and acquire meaningful employment. It also helped employers to find enthusiastic summer help. Most offices were open from May to August, and were staffed by experienced university students. The Ottawa, Winnipeg, London, and Windsor SCCY offices were open on a year-round basis.

Student services 
The SCCY offered the following no charge services:
 Student job postings
 Assistance in developing résumés and cover letters
 Helping with job interview techniques, through a mock interview
 Creative job search techniques
 Group information sessions
 Casual labour/odd job opportunities
 Volunteer experience opportunities
 Information on health and safety in the workplace
 Information on wage rates, Employment Standards, labour laws, and human rights
 Information on federal or provincial/territorial government programs and services

Employer services 
The SCCY provided the following services at no charge:
 Job-posting services
 Pre-screening of potential candidates
 Immediate access to enthusiastic students from all fields to help fill employment opportunities
 Flexible staffing options to suit individual business requirements (i.e. casual labour, long- or short-term employment) 
 Posting services for volunteer opportunities
 Information on health and safety in the workplace
 Information on prevailing wage rates, employment standards and labour laws
 Labour market information
 Information on federal and provincial/territorial government programs and services

Footnotes 

Education in Canada
Federal departments and agencies of Canada
Employment in Canada